The 1948 Ostzonenmeisterschaft Final decided the winner of the 1948 Ostzonenmeisterschaft, the 1st edition of the Ostzonenmeisterschaft, a knockout football cup competition to decide the champions of the Soviet occupation zone.

The match was played on 4 July 1948 at the Probstheidaer Stadion in Leipzig. SG Planitz won the match 1–0 against Freiimfelde Halle for their 1st title.

Route to the final
The Ostzonenmeisterschaft was a ten team single-elimination knockout cup competition. There were a total of three rounds leading up to the final. Four teams entered the qualifying round, with the two winners advancing to the quarter-finals, where they were joined by six additional clubs who were given a bye. For all matches, the winner after 90 minutes advances. If still tied, extra time was used to determine the winner.

Match

Details

References

FSV Zwickau matches
Turbine Halle matches
1948–49 in German football
Association football matches in Germany